Karla Deras (born September 14, 1989) is an American fashion designer, fashion blogger, and former singer. She is the designer of a fashion line called "The Line by K" and maintains her site, "Karla's Closet."

Karla photographs her looks on her site and often mixes vintage pieces, from labels like Versace with modern companies. She has referred to her style as a "pot of stew" which includes "simplicity," "androgyny" and "femininity." 

Karla was also briefly in an American girl group called the Slumber Party Girls, the house band for the TV show Dance Revolution; they also had a mini-show called KOL Secret Slumber Party on CBS.

Karla, along with other bloggers, designed a bag for Coach.

See also
The Sartorialist
Glamourina

References

External links
Official website
Deras' Twitter
TeenVogue's Keys to Success American Apparel Teams Up With Chictopia For New Advertisements

American women bloggers
American bloggers
Living people
Slumber Party Girls members
1989 births
21st-century American women